Rising East is an online journal focusing on social and cultural issues associated with the regeneration of east London.

History and profile
Rising East was founded in 1998. Produced by the University of East London's Research Institute, it was originally a print journal produced by Lawrence & Wishart (as a Journal of East London Studies). It was published three times a year. It become an online-only publication in 2004. The journal was reestablished in 2012.

References

External links
 Original L&W Rising East site
 Current issue

Cultural magazines published in the United Kingdom
Local interest magazines published in the United Kingdom
Magazines published in London
Magazines established in 1998
Magazines disestablished in 2004
Online magazines published in the United Kingdom
Online magazines with defunct print editions
Triannual magazines published in the United Kingdom
University of East London
Lawrence & Wishart books